Susan Rose may refer to:

 Susan Rose (EastEnders), soap opera character
 Susan Rose (producer) (born 1957), American theatrical and film producer